Geoffrey Huw Davies (born 18 February 1959, in Eastbourne) is an English rugby union player, who played as fly-half. He attended King Edwards VI College, Stourbridge, in the West Midlands. He played for Coventry FC (RU), Wasps RFC and for England.

Career 
Davies had first test cap  on 21 February 1981, during a match against Scotland, his last cap was against France, on 15 March 1986. He was also called up for the 1987 Rugby World Cup England squad, but he did not play any match at the tournament.

Honours 

 21 caps (+ 5 non-test) for England
 Caps by year : 5 in 1981, 3 in 1982, 3 in 1983, 3 in 1984, 3 in 1985, 4 in 1986
 Disputed Five Nations Championships  : 1981, 1982, 1983, 1984, 1986

References

External links 
 Huw Davies International statistics on scrum.com

Rugby union fly-halves
England international rugby union players
1959 births
Living people
Wasps RFC players
Coventry R.F.C. players
Cambridge University R.U.F.C. players
Barbarian F.C. players
Rugby union players from Eastbourne